Sherwood railway station was a station on the former Great Northern Railway Nottingham Suburban railway in Nottingham. The station lies within Woodthorpe Grange Park in Woodthorpe.

The NSR was built mainly for the brickworks of Mapperley and Thornywood, however, there were passenger services to Daybrook and Sherwood Station. In 1905, Parry sold the estate to Godfrey Small a Nottingham City Councillor. Meanwhile, the railway was struggling with the opening of the electric tram from Nottingham City Centre to Sherwood. In 1916 the regular passenger service was withdrawn and Sherwood Station closed.

Woodthorpe Grange Park opened to the public in 1922. On 10 July 1928 King George V and Queen Mary visited the park and 17,000 school children travelled to the event on the NSR to Sherwood Station (which had been re-opened for the event). An enthusiasts special ran on 16 June 1951 but goods train finished on 1 August 1951 when the line was abandoned. The track was lifted in 1954.

See also
St Ann's Well railway station
Thorney Wood railway station
Nottingham's Tunnels

References

Further reading

Marshall, J., (June 1961) "Nottingham Suburban Railway" Railway Magazine article

Disused railway stations in Nottinghamshire
Former Great Northern Railway stations
Railway stations in Great Britain opened in 1889
Railway stations in Great Britain closed in 1916